Hierobotana is a monotypic genus of flowering plants belonging to the family Verbenaceae. The only species is Hierobotana inflata.

Its native range is Western South America.

References

Verbenaceae
Verbenaceae genera
Monotypic Lamiales genera